Nesjestranda is a small village situated along Romsdal Fjord in Molde Municipality, Møre og Romsdal county, Norway. It is located along Norwegian County Road 64 on the Romsdal Peninsula facing the islands of Sekken and Veøya, just north of the mouth of the Langfjorden.

Since 1991, it has been connected to the town of Molde via the Bolsøy Bridge, the island of Bolsøya, and the undersea Fannefjord Tunnel. Prior to this, the inhabitants were dependent on a ferry between Lønset and Grønnes or a long drive around the entire Fannefjorden.  One of the most important industries in Nesjestranda is a furniture factory called Nesje, formerly called Nesjestranda Møbelfabrikk.  

Veøy Church is located just south of Nesjestranda in the village of Sølsnes.

Notable residents
 Leo Eitinger hid here during World War II, in the same house as:
 Rikke Flovikholm, once noted in Guinness Book of Records as the longest working church organist.

References

External links
 http://www.nesje.no 

Molde
Romsdal
Villages in Møre og Romsdal